Gareth Thomas (born 2 August 1993) is a Welsh rugby union player who plays for Ospreys in the United Rugby Championship and the Wales national team as a Prop.

Club career
Thomas made his debut for the Ospreys regional team in 2014 having previously played for Carmarthen Quins, Llanelli RFC and Newcastle Emlyn RFC. He was also connected to the Scarlets region before joining the Ospreys.

His cousin is Scarlets loosehead prop Steffan Thomas.

International
Thomas was selected in the Wales squad for the 2021 July rugby union tests and made his debut off the bench against Canada.

He was selected in the Wales squad for the 2021 Autumn Nations Series.

Thomas started all three tests against South Africa in 2022, and part of a famous first Welsh victory on South African soil.

References

External links

Ospreys Player Profile
WRU Profile

1993 births
Living people
Carmarthen Quins RFC players
Llanelli RFC players
Ospreys (rugby union) players
Rugby union players from Ceredigion
Scarlets players
Welsh rugby union players
Rugby union props